Hallikar (Kannada: ಹಳ್ಳಿಕಾರ್) is a breed of cattle native to the state of Karnataka, India. It derives its name from the Hallikar community traditionally known for their cattle rearing. It is commonly found in the traditional Hallikar belt of Mysore, Mandya, Kolar, Hassan, Banglore rural and Tumkur districts of South Karnataka. 

Long, vertical and backward bending horns, large humps in males, moderate to long height and medium size of the body, and white to grey and occasionally black complexions, are the characteristics of the breed. The bulls of this breed of cattle are known for their strength and endurance, and are mainly used for draft purposes. It has more resisiable power in it is milk. It is classified as a draught breed in India. Hallikar is classified as draught breed because in southern India cow was  used for ploughing field. 

It is the only breed in world both ox and cow can be used in ploughing. Hallikar is a breed which can  work 18 to 20 hours in a day . It gives milk of 2 to 3 liters.  

It is one of the two breeds, along with Amrit Mahal, which have received the royal patronage and care from the erstwhile Maharajas of Mysore State through conservation and development. The breed is said to be the origin of Amrit Mahal cattle. 

The Department of Posts, Government of India commemorated the breed by releasing a postage stamp in its name in 2000.

See also
List of cattle breeds

References 

Cattle breeds originating in India
Economy of Karnataka
Cattle breeds